Qeshlaq-e Owch Darreh al Tafat (also Romanized as Qeshlāq-e Owch Darreh al Tafāt) is a village in Qeshlaq-e Sharqi Rural District, Qeshlaq Dasht District, Bileh Savar County, Ardabil Province, Iran. At the 2006 census, its population was 28, in 5 families.

References 

Towns and villages in Bileh Savar County